The electoral districts of Lower Canada were territorial subdivisions of the British North American Province of Lower Canada serving as the basis of the representation of the population in the Legislative Assembly of Lower Canada, the lower house of the Provincial Parliament of Lower Canada. This house was the first legislative assembly in the history of Quebec. The districts were used between 1792 and 1838, date at which the constitution of the country was suspended as a consequence of the Rebellions of 1837.

The Constitutional Act of 1791 provided for the creation of a House of Assembly or Legislative Assembly, made up of at least 50 elected members. Lieutenant governor Alured Clarke divided the territory of the province into 27 districts each returning one or two Members to the Provincial Parliament. 23 districts were returning two MPPs and 4 were returning a single one. The rural districts were called  counties (French: comtés), while the urban ones were called cities (cités) or bouroughs (bourgs). 16 out of 27, bore typically English names, while the others bore French or Indigenous names.

In 1828, governor James Kempt, who was in good terms with the elected House of Assembly, favoured the redrawing of the electoral map: five new districts were created, in total electing 8 new MPPs, in the newly settled Eastern Townships. These elected their first representatives to Parliament in 1829. The following year, the old districts were subdivided into smaller ones, which for the most part were given French names. A last district was created in 1832 and a second seat was added to existing ones, so that when the constitution was suspended in 1838, there were 46 electoral districts in Lower Canada and they were returning 90 MPPs in total. 29 of these bore French names, 11 Indigenous names and 6 English names.

1792 to 1829

1829 to 1838

Notes

References
 Reports of Commissioners on Grievances Complained of in Lower Canada. Ordered by the House of Commons to be printed, 20th February, 1837, in Parliamentary Papers, 1837, XXIV, 3-416. (online)
Lacoursière, Jacques (1996). Histoire populaire du Québec, tome 2,  Sillery: Septentrion (preview)